Kendall's Pocket Encyclopedia was written by Edward Augustus Kendall and printed in London in 1802 by W. Peacock and Sons, with a second edition in 1811.

The full title is "A Pocket Encyclopedia; Or, Library of General Knowledge, Being a Dictionary of Arts, Sciences, and Polite Literature". It is made up of six very small volumes in a choice of 12mo, 18mo or 24mo (5 3/8" tall), and retailed at 18s.

The encyclopedia begins with "Abbe, a French word literally meaning an abbot" and ends with "Zootomy, the art or act of dissecting animals or living creatures."

A new edition of the Pocket Encyclopedia was compiled by minister and writer Jeremiah Joyce, and published as a "corrected and enlarged" edition in 1811. The new edition was published in four thicker 12mo volumes, and sold for £1 4s.

Legacy
An 1803 American version, Harris' Minor Encyclopedia, was edited and enlarged by the Rev. Thaddeus Mason Harris.

A German version, Brockhaus' Taschen-Encyklopädie (Pocket Encyclopedia), was published between 1816 and 1820.

References

External links
Second ed. available at HathiTrust

1802 non-fiction books
1811 non-fiction books
19th-century encyclopedias
English-language encyclopedias
British encyclopedias
Reference works in the public domain